Comilla-8 is a constituency represented in the Jatiya Sangsad (National Parliament) of Bangladesh since 2019 by Nasimul Alam Chowdhury of the Awami League.

Boundaries 
The constituency encompasses Barura Upazila.

History 
The constituency was created for the first general elections in newly independent Bangladesh, held in 1973.

Ahead of the 2014 general election, the Election Commission reduced the boundaries of the constituency. Previously it had included Comilla Dakshin Municipality and five union parishads of Comilla Sadar Dakshin Upazila: Bara Para, Bijoypur, Chouara, Purba Jorekaran, and Paschim Jorekaran, but had excluded one union parishad of Barura Upazila: Chitadda.

Members of Parliament

Elections

Elections in the 2010s 
Nurul Islam Milon was elected unopposed in the 2014 general election after opposition parties withdrew their candidacies in a boycott of the election.

Elections in the 2000s 

Akbar Hossain died in June 2006. To fill the vacant seat, the Election Commission planned a by-election for 7 September. The High Court, however, blocked the by-election on the grounds that it would be wasteful, as the parliament's tenure was due to end in October with the formation of a caretaker government in preparation for the next general election.

Elections in the 1990s

References

External links
 

Parliamentary constituencies in Bangladesh
Cumilla District